NGC 4194, the Medusa merger, is a pair of interacting galaxies in the constellation Ursa Major.

References

Citations

External links 

 

Peculiar galaxies
Interacting galaxies
Luminous infrared galaxies
Ursa Major (constellation)
4194
07241
39068
160